Estela Fernández Pablos (born 9 May 1991) is a Spanish footballer who plays as a midfielder for Madrid CFF.

Club career
Fernández started her career at Rayo Vallecano B. In September 2018, she transferred from Rayo Vallecano to Madrid CFF. She had previously played for the latter club three seasons before. In the 2018–19 Primera División season, she was top goalscorer for Madrid CFF with 10 goals.

Personal life
Since 2017, Fernández has been a police officer for the National Police Corps. She also holds a degree in law.

References

External links
Profile at La Liga

1991 births
Living people
Women's association football midfielders
Spanish women's footballers
Footballers from Madrid
Madrid CFF players
Rayo Vallecano Femenino players
CF Pozuelo de Alarcón Femenino players
Primera División (women) players
Spanish police officers